Pandit or Pandith is an Indian and Nepalese Brahmin surname. When prefixed to a name, it denotes a scholar, for example, Pandita Ramabai or Pandit Nehru. A Hindu priest is also respectfully called Pandit ji.

Film
Anand Pandit, Indian film producer
Ashoke Pandit (born 1966), Indian filmmaker and social activist
Chetan Pandit, Bollywood actor
Gaurie Pandit Dwivedi (born 1982), Indian actress
Jatin Pandit, Bollywood film composer
Kalpana Pandit (born 1967), Indian film actress, model, and emergency physician
Radhika Pandit (born 1984), Indian actress
Ridhima Pandit (born 1990), Indian actress and model
Santhosh Pandit (born 1973), Malayalam film actor, singer
Shiv Panditt (born 1984), Indian actor
Shraddha Pandit (born 1982), Indian playback singer
Shweta Pandit (born 1986), Indian actress and singer
Sulakshana Pandit (born 1954), Indian actress and singer
Surbir Pandit, Nepalese actor
Tejaswini Pandit (born 1990), Indian actress
Vijayta Pandit (born 1967), Indian actress
Yash Pandit (born 1981), Bollywood actor

Sports
 Arjun Pandit (athlete) (born 1959), Nepalese marathon runner
 Chandrakant Pandit (born 1961), Indian cricketer
 Krishna Pandit (born 1998), Indian footballer
 Nitin Pandit (born 1975), Indian cricketer
 Ravinder Pandit (born 1959), Indian cricketer
 Rohan Pandit (born 1981), Indian cricketer
 Ronak Pandit (born 1985), Indian shooter
 Shobha Pandit (born 1956), Indian cricketer

Other
 Balraj Pandit, Indian playwright in Hindi and Punjabi
 Bansi Pandit (born 1942), Indian writer and speaker on Hinduism
 Devaki Pandit (born 1965), Indian playback singer
 Korla Pandit (1921–1998), American musician, composer and TV personality
 Lal Babu Pandit, Nepalese politician
 M. P. Pandit (1918–1993), Indian spiritualist, teacher and Sanskrit scholar
 Rahul Pandit (born 1956), Indian physicist
 Rajani Pandit (born 1962), Indian private investigator
 Vijaya Lakshmi Pandit (1900–1990), Indian diplomat and politician
 Vikram Pandit (born 1957), Indian-American banker
 Yadav Pandit, Nepalese research scholar

See also
 Pandita (disambiguation)
 Farah Pandith (born 1968), American academician

Ethnic groups in Nepal
Bahun
Nepali-language surnames
Khas surnames